Lasse Sørensen may refer to:

 Lasse Sørensen (footballer, born 1982)
 Lasse Sørensen (footballer, born 1999)
 Lasse Sørensen (racing driver)